The Manifesto of the 121 (full title: Déclaration sur le droit à l’insoumission dans la guerre d’Algérie or Declaration on the right of insubordination in the Algerian War) was an open letter signed by 121 intellectuals and published on 6 September 1960 in the magazine Vérité-Liberté. It called on the French government, then headed by the Gaullist Michel Debré, and public opinion to recognise the Algerian War as a legitimate struggle for independence, denouncing the use of torture by the French army, and calling for French conscientious objectors to the conflict to be respected by the authorities.

The Declaration was drafted by Dionys Mascolo, Maurice Blanchot and Jean Schuster. It stated that the cause of the Algerians was the cause of all free men, and that the struggle was striking a decisive blow to the cause of colonialism. The vast majority of the signatories belonged to the French Left. The signatories included figures from a variety of political and cultural movements, such as Marxism, existentialism, and a number of figures associated with the Nouveau Roman and New Wave literary and cinematic trends.

List of signatories 

 Arthur Adamov, writer
 Robert Antelme, writer and former deportee in the Buchenwald concentration camp
 Georges Auclair, journalist
 Jean Baby, historian
 Hélène Balfet
 Marc Barbut
 Robert Barrat
 Simone de Beauvoir, philosopher and feminist
 Jean-Louis Bedouin
 Marc Beigbeder, philosopher and journalist (close to the personalists)
 Robert Benayoun, film-maker and film critic
 Michèle Bernstein, situationist
 Maurice Blanchot, writer
 Roger Blin, actor and dramaturgist
 Arsène Bonnefous-Murat
 Geneviève Bonnefoi
 Raymond Borde
 Jean-Louis Bory, writer, journalist and film critic
 Jacques-Laurent Bost, journalist
 Pierre Boulez, composer
 Vincent Bounoure
 André Breton, surrealist 
 Guy Cabanel
 Georges Condominas, anthropologist
 Alain Cuny, actor
 Jean Czarnecki
 Jean Dalsace
 Adrien Dax
 Hubert Damisch, philosopher
 Guy Debord, situationist
 Bernard Dort
 Jean Douassot
 Simone Dreyfus
 Marguerite Duras, writer
 Yves Ellouet
 Dominique Eluard
 Charles Estienne 
 Louis-René des Forêts, writer
 Théodore Fraenkel
 André Frénaud, poet
 Jacques Gernet, sinologist
 Louis Gernet, philologist and sociologist
 Edouard Glissant, writer
 Anne Guérin
 Daniel Guérin, historian
 Jacques Howlett
 Édouard Jaguer, poet and art critic
 Pierre Jaouen
 Gérard Jarlot
 Robert Jaulin, ethnologist
 Alain Joubert
 Henri Krea
 Robert Lagarde
 Monique Lange
 Claude Lanzmann, film-maker
 Robert Lapoujade, painter and film maker
 Henri Lefebvre, sociologist
 Gérard Legrand
 Michel Leiris, writer and ethnologist
 Paul Lévy, mathematician
 Jérôme Lindon, publisher of Les Éditions de Minuit
 Eric Losfeld
 Robert Louzon
 Olivier de Magny, poet
 Florence Malraux

 André Mandouze, academic
 Maud Mannoni, psycho-analyst
 Jean Martin, actor
 Renée Marcel-Martinet
 Jean-Daniel Martinet
 Andrée Marty-Capgras
 Dionys Mascolo, writer
 François Maspero, editor of Maspero Ed.
 André Masson, painter 
 Pierre de Massot, writer and journalist
 Jean-Jacques Mayoux
 Jehan Mayoux
 Théodore Monod, naturalist and explorer
 Marie Moscovici
 Georges Mounin
 Maurice Nadeau, publisher
 Georges Navel
 Claude Ollier, writer (Nouveau Roman)
 Hélène Parmelin, writer, journalist and art critic
 José Pierre, writer
 Marcel Péju
 André Pieyre de Mandiargues, writer
 Edouard Pignon, painter
 Bernard Pingaud
 Maurice Pons, writer
 Jean-Bertrand Pontalis, philosopher and psychoanalyst
 Jean Pouillon, ethnologist
 Madeleine Rebérioux, historian
 Denise René, art gallerist
 Alain Resnais, film-maker
 Jean-François Revel, journalist
 Paul Revel
 Alain Robbe-Grillet, writer (Nouveau Roman)
 Christiane Rochefort, writer
 Jacques-Francis Rolland
 Alfred Rosmer, trade-unionist
 Gilbert Rouget, ethnomusicologist
 Claude Roy, writer
 Françoise Sagan, writer
 Marc Saint-Saëns, tapestrist
 Nathalie Sarraute, writer
 Jean-Paul Sartre, philosopher
 Renée Saurel
 Claude Sautet, scenarist and film-maker
 Catherine Sauvage, singer and actress
 Laurent Schwartz, mathematician 
 Jean Schuster
 Robert Scipion, journalist and writer
 Louis Seguin, engineer and industrialist
 Geneviève Serreau, actress
 Simone Signoret, actress
 Jean-Claude Silbermann, painter and writer
 Claude Simon, writer
 René de Solier
 D. de la Souchère
 Jean Thiercelin
 François Truffaut, film-maker
 René Tzanck
 Vercors, writer
 Jean-Pierre Vernant, historian
 Pierre Vidal-Naquet, historian
 J.-P. Vielfaure
 Claude Viseux, painter and sculptor
 Ylipe
 René Zazzo, psychologist

See also 
Manifesto

References

External links
The full text of the declaration and a full list of signatories 

Political history of France
Political manifestos
Algerian War
1960 in France
1960 in politics
Works originally published in French magazines
1960 documents